Li Dan or Lidan may refer to:

People
 Laozi ( 6th century BC), philosopher and founder of Taoism, one of his posthumous names being Li Dan
 An Indian Brahmin who died in Xi'an in 564 CE, known for the Tomb of Li Dan
 Emperor Ruizong of Tang (662–716), 2-time Tang emperor, known as Li Dan from 678 to 690
 Li Siyuan (867–933), Later Tang emperor, known as Li Dan from 927 to 933
 Li Dan (magnate) (died 1625), Chinese merchant and political figure
 Li Dan (sport shooter) (born 1962), Chinese sport shooter
 Li Dan (activist) (born 1978), Chinese HIV/AIDS activist
 Li Dan (speed skater) (born 1986), female Chinese speed skater (Olympian 2014)
 Li Dan (speed skater) (born 1994), female Chinese speed skater (Olympian 2018)
 Li Dan (gymnast) (born 1988), female Chinese trampoline gymnast
 Li Dan (runner) (born 1995), Chinese long-distance runner
 Li Tan (died 757), Tang prince

Places
 Lidan River, a Swedish river
 Lidan, Li County (澧澹街道), a subdistrict in Li County, Hunan, China

See also
 Daniel Little, American philosopher and professor who publishes in China under his Chinese name "Li Dan"

Li, Dan